Steve Tshwete Local Municipality (formerly Middelburg Local Municipality) is located in the Nkangala District Municipality of Mpumalanga province, South Africa. The seat of Steve Tshwete Local Municipality is Middelburg. The local municipality was one of the four to have passed the 2009-10 audit by the Auditor-General of South Africa, who deemed it to have a clean administration.

The municipality is named after Steve Tshwete, ANC activist imprisoned by the apartheid authorities on Robben Island from February 1964 to 1983.

Main places
The 2011 census divided the municipality into the following main places:

Politics 

The municipal council consists of fifty-eight members elected by mixed-member proportional representation. Twenty-nine are elected by first-past-the-post voting in twenty-nine wards, while the remaining twenty-nine are chosen from party lists so that the total number of party representatives is proportional to the number of votes received.  In the election of 1 November 2021 no party won a majority on the council. The African National Congress (ANC) was the largest party, winning twenty-one seats.

The following table shows the results of the election.

Municipal services
Middelburg's municipal workers started sporadic strikes in September 2021, and these continued into 2022 which affected several services. Licenses could not be renewed at the license office, property transfers could not be done, refuse was not removed and security guards shot two strikers, while political parties chose not to intervene.

References

External links 
 Official homepage

Local municipalities of the Nkangala District Municipality